This Silence Kills is the debut studio album by Brazilian singer-songwriter Dillon, released on November 21, 2011 on BPitch Control. The album received positive reviews from music critics.

The song "Thirteen Thirtyfive" is based on "Pocketful of Money" by Swedish singer-songwriter Jens Lekman.

Style

German music magazine Musikexpress called the album "chanson-pop" and noted influences from electronic music. Dillon's vocals on the album have been compared to those of Björk.

Critical reception

This Silence Kills received largely positive reviews from contemporary music critics. At Metacritic, which assigns a normalized rating out of 100 to reviews from mainstream critics, the album received an average score of 72, based on 5 reviews, which indicates "generally favorable reviews".

Markus Schneider of the Berliner Zeitung praised the album. Schneider noted that Dillon's electronic music distinguished her from many other songwriters, "who merely include electronic music as decorations." In a review for the BBC, Mike Diver lauded the album, saying, "Dillon uses spare beats, subtle orchestrations and background-mixed brass, but everything is bound by a vocal that speaks to the soul, not the soles."

Track listing

References

2011 debut albums
Dillon (singer) albums
BPitch Control albums